Maurice Mollin (6 May 1924 – 5 August 2003) was a Belgian racing cyclist. He rode in the 1947 and 1948 Tour de France. He finished in fifth place in the 1957 Paris–Roubaix.

References

External links

1924 births
2003 deaths
Belgian male cyclists
Cyclists from Antwerp
20th-century Belgian people